There are several characters named Amphion in Greek mythology:

 Amphion, son of Zeus and Antiope, and twin brother of Zethus (see Amphion and Zethus). Together, they are famous for building Thebes. Pausanias recounts an Egyptian legend according to which Amphion employed magic to build the walls of the city. Amphion married Niobe, and killed himself after the loss of his wife and children (the Niobids) at the hands of Apollo and Artemis. Diodorus Siculus calls Chloris his daughter, but the other accounts of her parentage identify her father as another Amphion, the ruler of Minyan Orchomenus (see below).
 Amphion, son of King Iasus of Orchomenus, son of Persephone, daughter of Minyas. He became the father of Chloris, wife of Neleus and Phylomache, wife of Pelias; these husbands are sons of Tyro and Poseidon. This Amphion is an obscure character, said to be a king of the Minyans of Orchomenus, in Boeotia.
 Amphion, son of Hyperasius, son of Pelles, son of Phorbas. From Achaean Pellene, he and his brother Asterius were counted among the Argonauts that sailed to Colchis. In two separate accounts, Hypso was called their mother while Hippasus was said to be their father.
 Amphion of Elis, an Achaean warrior who took part in the Trojan War on the side of the Greeks. He was a commander of the Epeans, together with Meges and Dracius.
Amphion, friend of the celebrated architect Epeius. He was killed by Aeneas.

Notes

References 
 Apollodorus, The Library with an English Translation by Sir James George Frazer, F.B.A., F.R.S. in 2 Volumes, Cambridge, MA, Harvard University Press; London, William Heinemann Ltd. 1921. . Online version at the Perseus Digital Library. Greek text available from the same website.
 Apollonius Rhodius, Argonautica. George W. Mooney. London. Longmans, Green. 1912. Greek text available at the Perseus Digital Library.
 Brill’s New Pauly: Encyclopaedia of the Ancient World. Antiquity, Volume 1, A-Ari, editors: Hubert Cancik, Helmuth Schneider, Brill, 2002. . Online version at Brill.
 Diodorus Siculus, The Library of History translated by Charles Henry Oldfather. Twelve volumes. Loeb Classical Library. Cambridge, Massachusetts: Harvard University Press; London: William Heinemann, Ltd. 1989. Vol. 3. Books 4.59–8. Online version at Bill Thayer's Web Site
 Diodorus Siculus, Bibliotheca Historica. Vol 1-2. Immanel Bekker. Ludwig Dindorf. Friedrich Vogel. in aedibus B. G. Teubneri. Leipzig. 1888–1890. Greek text available at the Perseus Digital Library.
Gaius Valerius Flaccus, Argonautica translated by Mozley, J H. Loeb Classical Library Volume 286. Cambridge, MA, Harvard University Press; London, William Heinemann Ltd. 1928. Online version at theio.com.
Graves, Robert, The Greek Myths, Harmondsworth, London, England, Penguin Books, 1960. 
 Grimal, Pierre, The Dictionary of Classical Mythology, Wiley-Blackwell, 1996. .
Homer, The Iliad with an English Translation by A.T. Murray, Ph.D. in two volumes. Cambridge, MA., Harvard University Press; London, William Heinemann, Ltd. 1924. Online version at the Perseus Digital Library.
 Pausanias, Description of Greece with an English Translation by W.H.S. Jones, Litt.D., and H.A. Ormerod, M.A., in 4 Volumes. Cambridge, MA, Harvard University Press; London, William Heinemann Ltd. 1918. Online version at the Perseus Digital Library
Quintus Smyrnaeus, The Fall of Troy translated by Way. A. S. Loeb Classical Library Volume 19. London: William Heinemann, 1913. Online version at theio.com

Kings in Greek mythology
Children of Zeus
Demigods in classical mythology
Argonauts
Characters in the Argonautica
Achaeans (Homer)
People of the Trojan War
Achaean characters in Greek mythology
Elean characters in Greek mythology
Minyan characters in Greek mythology